NIB Bank was a Pakistani bank which was based in Karachi, Pakistan. It was formed in 2003 as a result of merger of IFIC Bank and the National Development Leasing Corporation (NDLC), and this newly formed entity was called the NDLC-IFIC Bank (NIB).

The bank was established through the efforts of Khuwaja Iqbal Hassan and Sultan Ali Allana (now Chairman, HBL). In 2004, soon after NIB's creation, Fullerton Financial Holdings a subsidiary of Temasek Holdings acquired a majority stake in the bank. This was one of the largest Direct Foreign Investment in Pakistan at that time.

Fullerton Financial Holdings at that time, had stakes in banks across Asia and ran highly successful SME and Commercial businesses. Their models were adopted in NIB Bank and the Pakistan banking industry saw its first structured commercial and SME lending programs.

As of Dec 31, 2015 NIB Bank had a paid up capital of PKR 103 billion and total assets of PKR 243 billion. The bank had presence in 52 cities in Pakistan with over 170 branches connected online. NIB Bank had around 3,000 employees and its head office was in the city of Karachi. NIB Bank's main business units included Retail Banking, Commercial Banking, Corporate and Investment Banking and Treasury Services. The Bank competed with all other major banks operating in Pakistan.

NIB bank ceased its operations in Pakistan with effect from July 7, 2017 and its assets now stand amalgamated into MCB.

Senior management
Atif R. Bokhari was the President and currently the Chief Executive Officer of NIB Bank is Yameen Karai.

Teo Cheng San, Roland has been an independent Chairman of the Board of NIB Bank since 1 August 2011.

History
NIB Bank completed ten years of operations in 2013. The Bank came into being in October 2003 after two financial entities were merged: the National Development Leasing Corporation (NDLC) and IFIC Bank. The new bank was named NIB Bank.
As NIB Bank grew, it continued to acquire more banks. The Pakistan-based operations of Credit Agricole Indosuez were acquired in April 2004. In 2007, PICIC Commercial Bank Limited was also acquired by NIB Bank.

Pakistan Industrial Credit & Investment Corp. Ltd was merged with NIB Bank on 01-Jan-2008.

Temasek Holdings of Singapore continues to be the single largest investor in NIB Bank, through its wholly owned subsidiary, with a stake in excess of 88%.

Financial indicators – financial year 2015

References

External links

Official website

Defunct banks of Pakistan
Pakistani companies established in 2003
Banks established in 2003
Companies based in Karachi
Mergers and acquisitions of Pakistani companies
Banks disestablished in 2017
Pakistani companies disestablished in 2017